The Dawning of the Day is an American romantic novel written by Elisabeth Ogilvie and first published in 1954. The novel is the second Ogilvie's Bennett Island Family series of novels and forms the first part of her "Lover's Trilogy."

Plot Summary
Philippa Marshall, a young war widow, takes up the mantle of new school teacher on Bennett Island, a fictional lobster-fishing community on the coast of Maine. Her work leads to a romance with the handsome son of one of the town's leading families.

References

1954 American novels
American romance novels
Novels set in Maine
Contemporary romance novels